Claire Akossiwa Ayivon (born 11 August 1996) is a Togolese competitive rower.

She competed at the 2016 Summer Olympics in Rio de Janeiro, in the women's single sculls.

She represented Togo at the 2020 Summer Olympics.

References

External links

1996 births
Living people
Togolese female rowers
Olympic rowers of Togo
Rowers at the 2014 Summer Youth Olympics
Rowers at the 2016 Summer Olympics
Rowers at the 2020 Summer Olympics
People from Maritime Region
21st-century Togolese people